Franklin Delano Reeves (July 14, 1933 – January 1, 2007) was an American country music singer, best known for his "girl-watching" novelty songs of the 1960s including "Girl on the Billboard" and "The Belles of Southern Bell". He is also known for his 1968 trucker's anthem, "Looking at the World Through a Windshield", which demonstrated he was capable of more than just novelty songs. He became one of the most successful male country singers of the 1960s.

Early life
Reeves was born in Sparta, North Carolina, United States, the youngest of 11 children. He was named after U.S. President Franklin Delano Roosevelt. While his older brothers served in World War II, Reeves learned how to play their musical instruments. By age 12, Reeves began performing on the Merry Go Round Show on local radio station WPAQ.

After high school, Reeves briefly attended Appalachian State College (now University). He later enlisted in the United States Air Force, stationed at Travis Air Force Base in Fairfield, California.

Music career

1950s
After completing his military service, Reeves began performing regularly on Chester Smith's radio show on Modesto station KTRB around 1955. Reeves made his first rockabilly recordings with Capitol Records from 1957 to 1958.

In 1958, Reeves began hosting a television variety show on Stockton station KOVR.

1960s–2000s
In 1961, Reeves signed with Decca Records and recorded the song that would become his first charting single, "Be Quiet Mind". Moving to Nashville in 1962, Reeves and wife Ellen Schiell co-wrote "Sing a Little Song of Heartache", a top five hit for Rose Maddox that year.

After stints with Reprise Records in 1963 and Columbia Records in 1964, Reeves signed with United Artists Records. Reeves became known as "The Doodle-Oo-Doo-Doo Kid" for the sound effect he added to his songs.

Under United Artists, he had his first number-one hit with "The Girl on the Billboard" in 1965. His follow-up, "The Belles of the Southern Bell", made the country top five. His success continued throughout the rest of the 1960s. Songs that became hits during this time are "Be Glad" and "Good Time Charlie's". In the late 1960s, he appeared in several Hollywood films, including a starring role in Cottonpickin' Chickenpickers, and a supporting role in Burt Reynolds' first big movie Sam Whiskey.

In the 1970s, he released a series of duets with Bobby Goldsboro and Penny DeHaven. He also returned to television, hosting the syndicated TV program, Del Reeves' Country Carnival.

His last big hit was "The Philadelphia Fillies".  His career declined in the mid-1970s, and then started to slowly move away from country music, although he recorded some duets with Billie Jo Spears in 1976. He had hit songs on the country chart most years until 1982.

In 1979, Reeves left his musical career to pursue a career as a music executive; he would eventually help Billy Ray Cyrus score his first major record deal. He continued to record in the 1980s on a reduced scale for smaller labels.

Discography

Albums

Singles

 APeaked at No. 96 on Billboard Hot 100 and No. 31 on the RPM Top Singles chart in Canada.

Music videos

Personal life
Reeves married Ellen Schiell in 1956 at the Stanislaus County fair in California; they had three children. Reeves died of emphysema on January 1, 2007, at his home in Centerville, Tennessee.

References

1933 births
2007 deaths
20th-century American singers
American country singer-songwriters
Country musicians from North Carolina
Deaths from emphysema
Grand Ole Opry members
People from Alleghany County, North Carolina
United Artists Records artists
Capitol Records artists
Columbia Records artists
Decca Records artists
Reprise Records artists
Musicians from Nashville, Tennessee
People from Centerville, Tennessee
Singer-songwriters from North Carolina
Singer-songwriters from Tennessee